Snapdragon or Antirrhinum is a genus of plants.

Snapdragon or Snap-dragon may also refer to:

Computing
 Qualcomm Snapdragon, a hardware platform and series of system on chips (SoCs) developed by Qualcomm for mobile devices

Movies and Novels
 Snapdragon (film), a 1993 American thriller film by Worth Keeter
 Snapdragon (graphic novel), a 2020 graphic novel by Kat Leyh

Music
 The Snapdragons, an independent British rock band

Comics & Games
 Snap-dragon (game), a parlour game
 Snapdragon (comics), a Japanese supervillain in the Marvel Comics Universe
 Snapdragon double, a call made during the bidding phase of contract bridge
 SnapDragon Games, a game developer for Nintendo platforms
 Snapdragon (Morituri), a Strikeforce character in Marvel comics
 Snapdragon Stadium, an American football stadium nearing completion in San Diego, California and sponsored by Qualcomm
 Snapdragon (Transformers), a character from the Transformers series

Military & Navy
 HMS Snapdragon, several ships belonging to UK's Royal Navy

Botany
 Maurandya scandens, a plant also called snapdragon vine